Thomas J. Dart (born May 22, 1962) is an American attorney, politician, and law enforcement officer serving as the Sheriff of Cook County, Illinois. He previously served as a member of both chambers of the Illinois General Assembly.

Education 
Dart graduated from Mount Carmel High School, Chicago. He earned a Bachelor of Arts degree in history and general social studies from Providence College and a Juris Doctor from Loyola University Chicago.

Career
Dart began his career as a state prosecutor in Cook County. Afterwards he was an Illinois State Senator, having been appointed in 1991 to fill the vacancy caused by the resignation of Senator Jeremiah E. Joyce (D-Chicago). He was then elected and served state representative as a Democrat for Illinois' 28th House District from January 1993 until January 2003, before becoming chief of staff to Cook County Sheriff Michael F. Sheahan. In November 2002, Dart was the Democratic nominee for state treasurer of Illinois but lost to incumbent Republican Judy Baar Topinka.

When Sheahan announced that he would retire as Cook County Sheriff in 2006, Dart announced his candidacy to succeed Sheahan. Dart won the Democratic primary election on March 21, 2006, defeating Sylvester Baker and Richard Remus by a wide margin, and won the general election in November 2006. On November 2, 2010, Dart faced Republican Frederick Collins in the race for the Cook County Sheriff's office and won handily with 69.37% of the vote. Dart declined to be a candidate in the 2011 Chicago mayoral election. After defeating three Democratic opponents in the 2014 primary election, Dart was unopposed for reelection in the general election of November 2014.

Foreclosures
In October 2008, Dart made national news when he announced that he was suspending all foreclosure evictions in Cook County. The number of such evictions had increased dramatically since 2006 as a result of the national subprime mortgage crisis. Dart stated that many of the people being evicted were renters who had faithfully paid their rent but had not known that their landlord was in financial trouble. He explained that in many cases, mortgage companies had not fulfilled their obligation to identify tenants in the foreclosed properties, and said, "These mortgage companies only see pieces of paper, not people, and don't care [...] who gets hurt along the way ... We're not going to do their jobs for them anymore. We're just not going to evict innocent tenants. It stops today."

The Illinois Bankers Association was critical of Dart, accusing him of "ignoring his legal responsibilities" and of engaging in "vigilantism". Dart claims he is enforcing an Illinois state law which requires the banks to determine whether the persons resident at an address are actually the persons to whom the foreclosure notice should be served. In 2009, Time named Dart one of its 100 Most Influential People of that year.

Craigslist lawsuit

In March 2009, Dart filed a lawsuit in federal court against Craigslist, Inc. (09-CV-1385), to close the "erotic services" section of Craigslist. The suit claims that Craigslist is the "largest source of prostitution". The lawsuit was dismissed on October 23, 2009 on the grounds that Craigslist is protected by Section 230 immunity.

Personal life
He and his wife Patricia live in Chicago's Mount Greenwood neighborhood. They have five children.

Electoral history
The following is Dart's electoral history since 1998:

References

External links
Cook County Sheriff's Office
Tom Dart biography

1962 births
Democratic Party Illinois state senators
Living people
Loyola University Chicago School of Law alumni
Democratic Party members of the Illinois House of Representatives
Politicians from Cook County, Illinois
Providence College alumni
Sheriffs of Cook County, Illinois